Charles Pascoe Grenfell (4 April 1790 – 21 March 1867) was a British businessman and Liberal Party politician.

Background
Grenfell was the son of the Cornishman Pascoe Grenfell and Charlotte (née Granville). He was a director of the Bank of England from 1830 to 1864. He was also chairman of the board of directors of the London Brighton and South Coast Railway from 1846 to 1848.

Political career
Grenfell was Member of Parliament for Preston from 1847 to 1852, and from 1857 to 1865.

Family
Grenfell married Lady Georgiana Frances, daughter of William Molyneux, 2nd Earl of Sefton, in 1819. They had two sons, Charles Grenfell and Henry Grenfell, and two daughters, Maria Georgiana, who married Frederick Paget, and Louisa Henrietta, who married Theodore Walrond. The family lived at Taplow Court, Taplow, Buckinghamshire.

Lady Georgiana died in June 1826. Grenfell survived her by over 40 years and died at his home, Taplow Court, in March 1867, aged 76.

References

External links
 

1790 births
1867 deaths
Liberal Party (UK) MPs for English constituencies
UK MPs 1847–1852
UK MPs 1857–1859
UK MPs 1859–1865
British people of Cornish descent
Charles